Cedar Grove Christian Academy is a private Christian school located in the Lawndale neighborhood of Philadelphia, Pennsylvania. It is located in the former Lawndale School building. The school was built in 1903–1904, and is a two-story, three-bay, stone-faced brick building in the Colonial Revival style. Two two-story wings designed by Irwin T. Catharine were added in the 1920s.  It features heavy stone sills and lintels and a crenellated parapet.

The building was added to the National Register of Historic Places in 1988.

References

External links

Christian schools in Pennsylvania
School buildings on the National Register of Historic Places in Philadelphia
Colonial Revival architecture in Pennsylvania
School buildings completed in 1904
Northeast Philadelphia